Hillsborough is a suburb of Auckland, New Zealand. It is under the local governance of the Auckland Council. Hillsborough is a leafy suburb of 20th-century houses. The area is serviced by two shopping areas; Onehunga and Three Kings. The area is served by secondary schools Mount Roskill Grammar School and Marcellin College.

History 

Since the mid-18th century, the Auckland isthmus has been within the rohe of Ngāti Whātua Ōrākei. The south-eastern Hillsborough area near the Manukau Harbour was traditionally referred to as Rangiaowhia, the name of a settlement and waka landing site south of Onehunga High School which was partially covered up by the construction of State Highway 20 in 1975. The name may reference the view of the cloudy sky above the high point of the Hillsborough ridge, Pukekāroro. The northern area of modern-day Hillsborough was known as Koheraunui, referencing the kohekohe trees which were once common in the lava forest landscape of the area, and was known for its kūmara (sweet potato) cultivations.

After the Musket Wars of the 1820s, Ngāti Whātua Ōrākei gave lands near Onehunga to the Tainui confederation of the Waikato as a tuku rangatira, a gift of reciprocity to thank the Waikato tribes for sheltering them during the war, and as a way to forge closer bonds. In the 1830s, Pōtatau Te Wherowhero, a powerful Tainui chief who later became the first Māori King, would spend time in various places around the Manukau Harbour and Auckland isthmus, including at Koheraunui in Hillsborough (modern-day Monte Cecilia). Pōtatau Te Wherowhero and his brother Kati Takiwaru occupied Koheraunui until 1840, when they settled at coastal Māngere. Pōtatau Te Wherowhero and Tāmati Ngāpora sold the land with the consent of Ngāti Whātua Ōrākei chief Apihai Te Kawau to English land-dealer William Hart in December 1844.

The suburb was named for James Carlton Hill, who left land to the city for use as public domains in his 1858 will. The Pah Homestead (or The Pah) was constructed for James Williamson by Thomas Mahoney on the 313-acre estate Pah Farm in 1877–1879. Of plastered brick in the Italianate style it is based upon Queen Victoria and Prince Albert's house Osbourne House in the Isle of Wight. It was allegedly the largest house ever built in New Zealand and one of the most expensive.

Following the failure of Williamson's business concerns after the stockmarket crash of 1886, the estate was progressively broken up and sold off. Various organisations established facilities on the smaller but still spacious properties that resulted from the subdivision; a Franciscan Friary, Marcellin College for boys, Roskill Masonic Hospital, and Liston Village (a residential home which includes the historic Pah Stable Block). Other parts of the property were purchased by the Hillsborough Bowling Club, The Church of Jesus Christ of Latter-day Saints who built a church on Pah Road, Sanitarium Wholefoods and Holeproof Enterprises who built factories on Pah Road and Auckland City Council who created Seymour Park. The rest of the extensive farmland was redeveloped as suburban housing although a portion to the south of Herd Road is still utilised for grazing land probably because it is very steep. The two storied Farm Managers House still stands at 1 Warren Avenue.

The Pah Mansion was eventually purchased by the Roman Catholic Church in 1913 and renamed Monte Cecilia. Part of the remaining land close to the house was developed as Monte Cecilia Primary School, and the house itself was used as emergency housing for many years. The Auckland City Council purchased the property in 2002. Its magnificent grounds contain a number of interesting specimen trees and is now part of a public park named Monte Cecilia Park which will eventually include the site of Monte Cecilia Primary School which will be relocated elsewhere in the area. The house has been renovated and is now being used to display Sir James Wallace's extensive collection of New Zealand Modern art.

Landmarks and features

Hillsborough Cemetery, a major cemetery in Auckland primarily in use between 1916 and 1976, located on the Hillsborough ridge
Monte Cecilia Park, a large public park in Hillsborough
Pah Homestead, a historic homestead and art gallery
The northern coastline of the Manukau Harbour, which includes Grannys Bay, Taylors Bay and Hillsborough Bay
St Francis Retreat Centre, a historic friary that opened in 1940.
The Waikōwhai Walkway, a  path linking Onehunga to Lynfield Cove.

Demographics

Hillsborough had a population of 12,489 at the 2018 New Zealand census, an increase of 1,371 people (12.3%) since the 2013 census, and an increase of 1,914 people (18.1%) since the 2006 census. There were 3,870 households, comprising 6,171 males and 6,315 females, giving a sex ratio of 0.98 males per female, with 1,965 people (15.7%) aged under 15 years, 3,252 (26.0%) aged 15 to 29, 5,478 (43.9%) aged 30 to 64, and 1,791 (14.3%) aged 65 or older.

Ethnicities were 38.4% European/Pākehā, 5.3% Māori, 8.1% Pacific peoples, 52.7% Asian, and 3.5% other ethnicities. People may identify with more than one ethnicity.

The percentage of people born overseas was 52.9, compared with 27.1% nationally.

Although some people chose not to answer the census's question about religious affiliation, 34.1% had no religion, 35.9% were Christian, 0.3% had Māori religious beliefs, 15.4% were Hindu, 4.7% were Muslim, 2.7% were Buddhist and 2.5% had other religions.

Of those at least 15 years old, 3,885 (36.9%) people had a bachelor's or higher degree, and 1,029 (9.8%) people had no formal qualifications. 1,902 people (18.1%) earned over $70,000 compared to 17.2% nationally. The employment status of those at least 15 was that 5,325 (50.6%) people were employed full-time, 1,521 (14.5%) were part-time, and 330 (3.1%) were unemployed.

Education

References 

 Colonial Architecture In New Zealand. John Stacpoole. A.H & A.W. Reed 1976, .

External links
Photographs of Hillsborough held in Auckland Libraries' heritage collections.

Suburbs of Auckland
Populated places around the Manukau Harbour